Thomas (the Tank Engine) & Friends is a children's television series about the engines and other characters working on the railways of the Island of Sodor, and is based on The Railway Series books written by the Reverend W. Awdry.

This article lists and details episodes from the fourteenth series of the show, which was first broadcast in 2010. This series was narrated by Michael Angelis for the UK audiences, while Michael Brandon narrated the episodes for the US audiences.

Episodes

Voice cast

References

2010 British television seasons
Thomas & Friends seasons